, also known as Shima Tomoyuki and Shima Katsutake, was a Japanese samurai of the late Sengoku period. Sakon eventually left the service of the Hatakeyama clan, Tsutsui Junkei, Toyotomi Hidenaga and eventually joined and serve under Ishida Mitsunari.

Biography
He was born in the Yamato province to Shima Matsukatsu, a local lords of Yamato Province. The Shima clan was considered to be a resident landholder around present-day Heguri-cho, Ikoma County, Nara Prefecture. Sakon served the Hatakeyama clan wo were the Shugo (Governors) of Kawachi Province.

In 1562, Sakon took part in the Battle of Kyokoji in which Hatakeyama Takamasa fought Miyoshi Nagayoshi, but Takamasa was defeated.

Later in 1577, Sakon became one of the two primary samurai officers under Tsutsui Junkei alongside Matsukura Shigenobu. Since he fought under command of Junkei during this time, he became one of the local lords belonging to the Tsutsui clan, gradually distinguished himself as a samurai taisho or samurai commander (a samurai who gives battle orders and maneuvers troops).

After the death of Junkei, It has been said that in January 1586, Sakon hired by Ishida Mitsunari and was convinced to serve the Toyotomi clan under Toyotomi Hidenaga (Hideyoshi’s brother) at Kyushu Campaign.

In 1591, after Hidenaga died, Ishida Mitsunari recruited him into his army as a leading strategist.

Later in 1598 after Hideyoshi died, Sakon proceeded to help Mitsunari as he struggled against Tokugawa Ieyasu.

In 1600, a few days before the battle of Sekigahara, Sakon led an assault on Ieyasu's Eastern army at Battle of Kuisegawa with great success. As always, he was one of the bravest generals of Ishida Mitsunari on the battlefield.

Battle of Sekigahara

On October 21, 1600, at the Battle of Sekigahara, Shima served as one of Ishida's higher-ranking officers, commander of Ishida Mitsunari forces, he commanding a unit of 1,000 men. Some sources suggest Shima led musketmen and that his position had cannons. He fought against Hosokawa Tadaoki and was shot by riflemen led by Kuroda Kanbei's son, Nagamasa, and forcing him to retreat. His fourth son, Shima Kiyomasa within Otani Yoshitsugu's ranks, killed by an 'Eastern' samurai named Takagi Heizaburō.
 
His fate remains somewhat of a mystery since he or his body was not on the battlefield after the battle. Some say he died of his wounds after the battle or escaped and died a few years later.

See also 
 People of the Sengoku period in popular culture

References

External links
 Portraits of the Samurai: Sakon Shima

1540 births
1600 deaths
Samurai
Japanese warriors killed in battle